Silvanus imitatus, is a species of silvan flat bark beetle found in India and Sri Lanka.

Description
Average length is about 2.41 mm. Body elongated, and moderately depressed. Dorsum uniformly reddish brown in color and covered with short,
semierect, golden pubescence. Eyes large and temple short. Antenna long and slender, with large scape and narrow pedicel. Prothorax convex, and almost equal in length and breadth. Prothorax generally broader, excluding anterior spines. Puncturation on head and pronotum are slightly coarser. Lateral margins of elytra are more distinctly wavy at middle. Scutellum large, transverse and pubescent.

References 

Silvanidae
Insects of Sri Lanka
Insects of India
Insects described in 1977